Yuzhong may refer to two county-level divisions in the PRC:

Yuzhong County (榆中县), of Lanzhou, Gansu
Yuzhong District (渝中区), Chongqing